Theretra pantarica is a moth of the  family Sphingidae. It is known from the island of Pantar in south-central Indonesia.

References

Theretra
Moths described in 2010